An Evacuation Transport is a vessel type employed by the U.S. Navy. Its designation is APH, and the vessel is used to evacuate personnel, principally the wounded.

Evacuation transports

References 

 

Ship types